Alexander Timm House is a tenement located in Bydgoszcz, Poland, at 17 Gdańska street.

Location

The building stands at the intersection of Gdańska and Pomorska streets.

History

The house has been built at the initiative of rentier Alexander William Timm in 1852.

It was designed by architect B. Brinkmann. Once erected, it was one of the largest tenement houses in the city of Bromberg.

The building has been rebuilt in 1910, as commissioned by the city councillor Carl Beck, and designed by O. M. W. Muller.

On the wall near the entrance on Gdańska street 17, a plaque has been placed in honor of Stanisław Brzęczkowski (1897-1955), an artist and educator, who worked at the printing house at 1 Jagiellońska Street.
 
At the end of 2017, a deep restoration of the building has taken place, underlining the different architectural details.

Architecture

Tenement presents architectural forms of historism, with touches of medieval architecture revival.

The southern facade elevation is flanked by octagonal slender towers, topped with battlements. On preserved iconography, one can notice facades painted in red, as for a brick defense wall, putting the finishing touch to the medieval setting.
It is the area's oldest two-storey tenement house.

Gallery

See also

 Bydgoszcz
 Dworcowa Street in Bydgoszcz
 Gdanska Street in Bydgoszcz
 Pomorska Street in Bydgoszcz

References

Bibliography
  

Buildings and structures on Gdańska Street, Bydgoszcz
Residential buildings completed in 1852
Houses completed in 1910
1852 establishments in Prussia
1852 establishments in Germany